Narodni trgovački lanac (NTL) is the Croatian retail trading chain founded in 2008. Upon its forming, NTL had about 8 billion Croatian kunas in revenues, 11,000 employees and approximately 1,000 outlets.  Its outlets are located in all counties with a total area larger than 250,000 square meters.

Their share in the Croatian market, about 17%, puts them in second place behind the biggest retail chain Konzum whose share is about 30 percent of the market.

Narodni trgovački lanac consists of 16 companies, and trade Kerum and Tommy from Split and Bakmaz from Zadar, Biljemerkant from Osijek and Boso from Vinkovci, Pemo from Dubrovnik and Studenac from Omiš and Trgonom from Novi Marof, Idis from Siska, Trgocentar from Virovitica and Zagreb chain Diona. In March 2010, the group was approached by three companies - Lonia from Kutina, Gavranović, Zagreb, and Trgocentar from Zabok.

Creation of National supermarket chain followed the pooling of retailers Mercator, Billa and Plodine who have decided to jointly approach the suppliers to ensure a more favorable purchase price of goods and positioning in the market. The biggest proponent of NTL was  Željko Kerum, the owner of supermarket chain Kerum, who claimed it to be the only way for a small regional trader to oppose the domination of the biggest Croatian retail chains.

References 

2008 establishments in Croatia
Retail companies of Croatia